Jessica Gulli-Nance (born 19 March 1988) is an Australian athlete specialising in the 400 metres and 400 metres hurdles. She competed in the 4 × 400 metres relay event at the 2015 World Championships in Beijing without qualifying for the final. Her personal bests are 53.22 seconds in the 400 metres (Melbourne 2015) and 57.30 seconds in the 400 metres hurdles (Melbourne 2014).

International competitions

References

External links

1988 births
Living people
Australian female sprinters
World Athletics Championships athletes for Australia
Athletes (track and field) at the 2014 Commonwealth Games
Sportspeople from Geelong
Commonwealth Games competitors for Australia
21st-century Australian women